Lisa Fiaola (born 25 November 1970) is a former dual international, she has represented Australia in rugby union and rugby league internationally. She made her international rugby union debut for Australia in 2001 against England in Sydney. She competed for Australia at the 2002 and 2006 Rugby World Cup's.

Fiaola was named in a 22-player squad that toured New Zealand in October 2007, she made her final appearance for the Wallaroos against the Black Ferns in Porirua.

References 

1970 births
Living people
Australian female rugby union players
Australia women's international rugby union players